= Bellambi, Belagavi =

Bellambi
- Village
- Country: India
- State: Karnataka
- District: Belagavi

Languages
  - Official: Kannada
- Time zone: UTC+5:30 (IST)

Bellambi is a village in the Hukeri subdivision of Belagavi district in the southern state of Karnataka, India. According to the 2011 Census, Bellambi had a population of 4,284 people and 895 households.
